Andy Roddick was the defending champion, but chose not to participate to protest the United Arab Emirates decision to deny Israeli player Shahar Pe'er a visa to enter the country for the women's tournament.

In the final, Novak Djokovic defeated David Ferrer, 7–5, 6–3.

Seeds

Draw

Finals

Top half

Bottom half

Qualifying

Seeds

Qualifiers

Lucky loser

Draw

First qualifier

Second qualifier

Third qualifier

Fourth qualifier

External links 
Draw
Qualifying Draw

Dubai Tennis Championships – Men's singles
2009 Dubai Tennis Championships